The commune of Ruhororo is a commune of Ngozi Province in northern Burundi. The capital lies at Ruhororo.

References

Communes of Burundi
Ngozi Province